Minetta Good, also known as Minnetta Good (1895–1946), was an American painter and printmaker who was part of the Works Progress Administration (WPA). Her work often depicted farm scenes, family life, and/or transportation.

Biography 
Born in 1895 in New York City. Good attended Cooper Union and New York School of Applied Design for Women. Good studied at the Art Students League of New York with F. Luis Mora, and Robert Henri and received training from Cecilia Beaux.

For much of the 1920s and 1930s Good lived in Califon and Freehold, New Jersey. She won many prizes through the National Association of Women Painters and Sculptors, including the 1932 Eloise Egan Prize for best landscape painting. She was one of the founders of the Salons of America, and exhibited widely throughout the United States.

During the Great Depression she produced work for the Federal Art Project. She created two murals for post offices in Dresden, Tennessee, and St. Martinville, Louisiana, for the Section of Painting and Sculpture. The Dresden mural, "Retrospection" (1938) depicts early days of the county and is still located in this original post office location.

Good created five murals at St. Martinsville, and one was relocated to a new post office location, the original location feature four circular ceiling light decorations in the lobby, depicting the magnolia, the azalea, the crawfish and the pelican painted in oils on canvas. At the St. Martinsville post office there was a larger painting of Evangeline, seated under an Evangeline Oak tree along the Bayou Teche with colorful water hyacinths and in the background is the Catholic church.

Death and legacy 
Good died in 1946, at age 51 in New York City, New York.

Good's art work is found in many public museum collections including at the Metropolitan Museum of Art, National Gallery of Art, Smithsonian American Art Museum. Art Institute of Chicago, Illinois State Museum, Iowa State University Museums, University of Massachusetts Amherst Gallery, Pennsylvania Academy of the Fine Arts, Newark Museum, University of Wyoming Art Museum, David Owsley Museum of Art Ball State University, among others.

See also 
 List of Federal Art Project artists

References

External links 

1895 births
1946 deaths
American women painters
American women printmakers
20th-century American painters
20th-century American printmakers
Painters from New York City
Art Students League of New York alumni
Federal Art Project artists
Section of Painting and Sculpture artists
20th-century American women artists
Cooper Union alumni
New York School of Applied Design for Women alumni
Students of Robert Henri